K. V. Srilekha Nair (born 23 April 1986), better known by her stage name Sshivada, is an Indian actress who appears in Malayalam and Tamil films.

Personal life
Sshivada was born as K. V. Srilekha Nair to Vijayarajan and Kumari, a Malayali family, in Tiruchirappalli, Tamil Nadu, where she studied till Grade 5. After grade 5, her family moved to Angamaly and there she was educated at Viswajyothi CMI Public School, Angamaly. She is a Computer Science engineering graduate from Adi Shankara Institute of Engineering Technology. She is married to her longtime boyfriend Murali Krishnan and has a daughter named Arundhathi.

Career 
Sshivada started her acting career through a small role in 2009 Malayalam anthology film Kerala Cafe. But she didn't get enough recognition. Later when working as a VJ in television, she was spotted by Malayalam director Fazil, who cast her as the female lead in his 2011 film Living Together. Then she auditioned for the Tamil film Nedunchaalai. Though her mother tongue is Malayalam, Sshivada managed to dub for her first film. She says, "I was born in Trichy and studied in Chennai till my fifth standard before moving to Kerala. So, I'm comfortable speaking Tamil." Sshivada received praise for her portrayal of Manga, a Malayalam village girl, who runs a dhaba. While Sify wrote "new find Shivada...steals the show. She lights the screen as she executes the loud, aggressive and righteous Manga with a lot of style and élan", Baradwaj Rangan called her a "terrific newcomer". In her next film Zero, a supernatural thriller directed by debutant Shiv Mohaa, a former assistant of Bharat Bala, she plays Priya, "a modern-day wife, who is also orthodox and holds on to some traditional values". In March 2017, Sshivada signed new project which is to be directed by Maya fame Ashwin Saravanan to star along with S J Suryah and Wamiqa Gabbi.

Filmography

References

External links
 
 

Living people
Actresses in Tamil cinema
21st-century Indian actresses
Actresses from Tiruchirappalli
1986 births
Actresses in Malayalam cinema
Indian film actresses